City Gallery was a contemporary art gallery in Leicester, England.  It closed 9 January 2010.

The gallery exhibited arts and crafts including international work but also local work reflecting the city's cultural diversity. The gallery had links with local schools and colleges holding events and workshops for young people.

References

External links
Leicester City Council site on City Gallery

Defunct museums in England
2010 disestablishments in England
Art museums and galleries in Leicestershire
Museums in Leicester